Alcaligenes viscolactis is a bacterium which can produce ropiness in milk and which can grow in sun tea.

References

Burkholderiales
Food safety